Robert Charles Murphy (October 9, 1926 – October 31, 2000) was a Maryland lawyer and jurist.  He served as Chief Judge of the Maryland Court of Appeals, the state's highest court, from 1972 to October 9, 1996, the same that day he turned 70 years old. Seventy is the Maryland State Constitution's mandatory retirement age for judges, which Murphy unsuccessfully attempted to raise to 75 years old.  Murphy was 45 years old when he was appointed by then Governor Marvin Mandel, making Murphy the youngest chief judge in Maryland state history.

Early life and career 
Robert Charles Murphy was born in Baltimore and attended Baltimore public schools, including Forest Park Senior High School.  He served in the United States Navy from 1944 to 1946.  He graduated from the University of Maryland Law School with a Juris Doctor in 1951. In 1952, he was admitted to the Maryland bar.

From 1955 to 1966, Murphy worked for the office of the Attorney General of Maryland, and in 1966, became Attorney General.

After his mandatory retirement as Chief Judge in 1996, the Maryland Court of Appeals building in Annapolis was renamed and dedicated in his honor as the Robert C. Murphy Courts of Appeal Building.

Personal life

Murphy was married to Helen Murphy. They had three children, Karen, Thomas and Kathy, and seven grandchildren.

His daughter, Karen Murphy Jensen, served as judge for the Circuit Court of Caroline County, Maryland from 1999 to 2016, and currently holds senior judge status.

He was Catholic.

External links
Robert C. Murphy (1926-2000), Archives of Maryland (Biographical Series), at the Maryland State Archives
Tributes to Chief Judge Robert C. Murphy, William H. Rehnquist, Lawrence F. Rodowsky, Alan M. Wilner, & Dennis M. Sweeney, 56 Md. L. Rev. 625 (1997).  Available at: http://digitalcommons.law.umaryland.edu/mlr/vol56/iss3/3

References

1926 births
2000 deaths
United States Navy personnel of World War II
Chief Judges of the Maryland Court of Appeals
Maryland Attorneys General
United States Navy sailors
University of Maryland Francis King Carey School of Law alumni
20th-century American judges